Pardiñas’ Andean mouse (Thomasomys pardignasi) is a species of sigmodontine rodent in the family Cricetidae known from the Cordillera del Cóndor and Cordillera de Kutukú, Ecuador. The species is named after Argentine palaeontologist .

References

Thomasomys
Endemic fauna of Ecuador
Mammals of Ecuador
Mammals described in 2021